Shustikov is a Russian masculine surname, its feminine counterpart is Shustikova. It may refer to

 Sergey Shustikov (footballer born 1989) (born 1989), Russian football player
 Sergey Shustikov (footballer born 1970) (1970–2016), Soviet and Russian football player and coach
 Viktor Shustikov (born 1939), Soviet and Russian football player and coach

Russian-language surnames